Núrio Domingos Matias Fortuna (born 24 March 1995) is an Angolan professional footballer who plays for Belgian club K.A.A. Gent as a left-back.

Club career

Braga
Fortuna was born in Luanda. Having played for five Portuguese clubs as a youth, he finished his development at S.C. Braga.

Fortuna spent three full seasons in the Segunda Liga with the reserve team. He made his debut in the competition on 21 August 2013, coming on as a second-half substitute in a 2–0 home win against C.F. União.

In one week in February 2014, Fortuna played his first match with the main squad in three different competitions. He started in the Taça de Portugal against C.D. Aves (3–1 win, after extra time), doing the same in the 4–1 Primeira Liga victory over Gil Vicente F.C. and the 2–1 away loss to Rio Ave F.C. in the semi-finals of the Taça da Liga.

On 14 June 2016, Fortuna was loaned to AEL Limassol of the Cypriot First Division.

Belgium
In the summer of 2017, Fortuna signed a three-year contract with R. Charleroi S.C. with a two-year option. He scored his first goal in the Belgian First Division A on 4 May 2019, in the 2–0 home defeat of Sint-Truidense VV.

Fortuna joined K.A.A. Gent of the same country and league on 25 June 2020, for a fee of €6 million.

International career
In September 2015, shortly after having received his Portuguese passport, Fortuna was called by Portugal under-21 manager Rui Jorge for a 2017 UEFA European Championship qualifier against Albania. He never played any matches for the country at that or any other level, however.

Fortuna won his first cap for Angola on 6 September 2019, featuring the entire 1−0 away win over Gambia for the 2022 FIFA World Cup qualifying stage.

References

External links

1995 births
Living people
Portuguese sportspeople of Angolan descent
Footballers from Luanda
Angolan footballers
Portuguese footballers
Association football defenders
Primeira Liga players
Liga Portugal 2 players
Real S.C. players
S.C. Braga B players
S.C. Braga players
Cypriot First Division players
AEL Limassol players
Belgian Pro League players
R. Charleroi S.C. players
K.A.A. Gent players
Angola international footballers
Angolan expatriate footballers
Portuguese expatriate footballers
Expatriate footballers in Cyprus
Expatriate footballers in Belgium
Angolan expatriate sportspeople in Belgium